James Samuel "Cornbread" Harris Sr. (born James Samuel Harris Jr.; April 23, 1927) is an American musician. He is a singer and pianist who performs in Minneapolis, Minnesota. He was a performer on Minnesota's first rock 'n' roll record, and is the father of record producer Jimmy Jam.

Family and early years
Harris was born James Samuel Harris Jr. on April 23, 1927 in Chicago, Illinois, the son of James Samuel Harris Sr. (1893–1930), a gambler, and his wife, Alberta Jones Nelson (1895–1930). When his father was shot while gambling and his mother died of grieving, he was orphaned at age 3. He lived with foster families until he was 11 or 12 when he and his sister went to live with his grandparents in Saint Paul, Minnesota. He has been married four times. One of his daughters died. He is the father of Jimmy Jam (James Harris III) who produced records for Janet Jackson, Mariah Carey and Usher.

Country music was an early influence, and Hank Williams and Gene Autry are among his early favorites.

Later career

Harris helped invent Augie Garcia's "Hi Yo Silver," a 1955 song that was Minnesota's first rock 'n' roll recording. He performed on the record, which he called a one-hit wonder (although Garcia is remembered as the godfather of Minnesota rock 'n' roll because of Augie's antics on stage upstaging Elvis Presley.).

Harris was in the U.S. military and later worked for about 25 years for American Hoist & Derrick.

His repertoire includes blues and jazz and in his nineties, Harris still plays Minneapolis nightclubs including the Loring Pasta Bar in Dinkytown, Clubhouse Jäger in the North Loop and Palmer's and the Nomad World Pub on the West Bank.

Harris is a mentor to Cadillac Kolstad and City Pages calls them the "must-see dueling-piano act in town".

Awards
The "Blues Legend Award"  (2012)
The Sally Awards  (2013)

References

External links
 

1927 births
Living people
American blues singers
American blues pianists
American male pianists
Singers from Minnesota
20th-century American pianists
21st-century American pianists
20th-century American male musicians
21st-century American male musicians